Gottlieb Conrad Christian Storr (June 16, 1749, Stuttgart – February 27, 1821, Tübingen) was a German physician, chemist, and naturalist.

In 1768 he obtained his doctorate from the University of Tübingen, where he also served as a professor of chemistry, botany, and natural history from 1774 to 1801. He is the taxonomic authority of several genera, including Mellivora, whose only species is the honey badger (Mellivora capensis).

Published works 
In 1781 he performed extensive scientific investigations in the Swiss Alps, publishing "" (1784–86, 2 vols.) as a result. Other noted written efforts by Storr include:

 "", 1768 (with Ferdinand Christoph Oetinger).
 , 1777.
 , 1780.
 "", 1785.
 "Idea methodi fossilium", 1807.

References

German naturalists
1749 births
1821 deaths
18th-century German physicians
University of Tübingen alumni
Academic staff of the University of Tübingen
Scientists from Stuttgart
Physicians from Stuttgart